Antonio Doncel (born 30 January 1967 in Spain) is a Spanish retired footballer who last played for Bergantiños in his home country.

Career

Doncel started his senior career with CD Lugo. In 1996, he signed for Hull City A.F.C. in the English Football League Third Division, where he made forty-three appearances and scored two goals. After that, he played for Spanish club Bergantiños before retiring in 2002.

References

External links 
 «Cuando jugué allí, su gran orgullo era ser la ciudad de The Housemartins», recuerda el gallego Antonio 
 Spanish practices find a new home 
 Dal Depor a la inglesa 
 Antonio continúa la estirpe de los ex-deportivistas en el Bergantiños 
 ¿Qué fue de los héroes del Superdépor? 
 BDFutbol Profile

1967 births
Living people
People from Sarria (comarca)
Sportspeople from the Province of Lugo
Spanish footballers
Levante UD footballers
Racing de Ferrol footballers
Deportivo de La Coruña players
Association football defenders
Hull City A.F.C. players
CD Lugo players
Real Burgos CF footballers
Bergantiños FC players
Expatriate footballers in England
La Liga players
Segunda División players
Segunda División B players